Texas NORML is a chapter of the National Organization for the Reform of Marijuana Laws (NORML) based in Austin, Texas. Jax Finkel serves as the organization's executive director. The organization's mission is to establish legal access to cannabis for all Texans.

The organization is registered in Texas and is federally recognized as a trans-partisan, educational 501(c)(4) nonprofit. Texas NORML's mission is to change marijuana laws so that it reflects the majority opinion of Texans which is that the responsible use of cannabis by adults and patients should no longer be subject to penalty. Their focus is to increase public awareness of current laws regarding cannabis, as well as the legislative system and legislation regarding cannabis consumers in Texas.

History
During the early 2000s, Mark Stepnoski, former All-Pro offensive lineman for the Dallas Cowboys and Houston Oilers, served as president of Texas NORML shortly after retiring from football.

In 2022, Texas NORML reported that polling statewide in Texas found that 67 percent of people support the legalization of the sale and use of cannabis.

See also
 List of cannabis organizations
 Cannabis in Texas

References

External links

 "Delta-8 in Texas Explained"
 

Cannabis in Texas
Cannabis organizations
National Organization for the Reform of Marijuana Laws

501(c)(4) nonprofit organizations
Non-profit organizations based in Texas